Anadolu Birlik Holding is a conglomerate headquartered in Turkey with companies in agriculture, food and tourism. It owns coal-fired power stations in Turkey such as the Çoban Yıldızı power stations and is on the global coal exit list.

In 2021 some assets were sold to pay down debts.

References 

Holding companies of Turkey